Stine Larsen (born 5 November 1975) is a retired Norwegian long-distance runner who specialized in the marathon.

In her younger days she won a bronze medal in the 10,000 metres at the inaugural European Under 23 Championships in 1997, finishing behind Olivera Jevtic and Annemari Sandell. She finished twelfth at the 2000 World Half Marathon Championships. In the marathon event she has finished seventeenth at the 2003 World Championships and twenty-fourth at the 2004 Olympic Games.

She became Norwegian champion in the half marathon in 1999, representing the sports club FIK BFG Fana.

Personal bests
5000 metres - 15:46.02 min (1997) 
10,000 metres - 32:28.16 min (2000) - fourth among Norwegian 10,000 metres runners, only behind Ingrid Kristiansen, Susanne Wigene and Gunhild Halle Haugen.
Half marathon - 1:09:28 hrs (2000) - third among Norwegian half marathon runners, only behind Ingrid Kristiansen and Grete Waitz.
Marathon - 2:27:05 hrs (2002) - third among Norwegian marathon runners, only behind Ingrid Kristiansen and Grete Waitz.

Achievements

References

1975 births
Living people
Norwegian female long-distance runners
Norwegian female marathon runners
Athletes (track and field) at the 2004 Summer Olympics
Olympic athletes of Norway
Sportspeople from Bergen